Selected from Dark They Were, and Golden-Eyed is a collection that contains the Ray Bradbury short story "Dark They Were, and Golden-Eyed" with several essays about the story.  It was published in 1991 by Signal Hill Publications as part of their Writers' Voices Series for students.  The story first appeared in the magazine Thrilling Wonder Stories in 1949.

Contents
 Note to the Reader
 About the Selection Dark They Were and Golden-Eyed
 "Dark They Were, and Golden-Eyed"
 Glossary
 Questions for the Reader
 About Ray Bradbury
 About Science Fiction and Fantasy
 Map of the Solar System
 About Mars
 About Space Travel

References

External links
 
 

1991 short story collections
Short story collections by Ray Bradbury